Aneesh G. Menon is an Indian actor who predominantly acts in Malayalam films. He has acted in the films Drishyam, Odiyan, Njan Prakashan, Driving License and Kayamkulam Kochunni.

Personal life
Aneesh married Aishwarya Rajan on January 18, 2019. The couple was blessed with a baby boy who they named him as Aryan Aneesh.

Career
His career started at Kerala People's Arts Club (KPAC) as a drama artist and has done almost 1000 stages in India.

Filmography

Television

References

External links

Living people
People from Malappuram district
Male actors in Malayalam cinema
Film directors from Kerala
21st-century Indian male actors
Male actors from Kerala
1985 births